Muzinga Football Club or simply Muzinga is a football (soccer) club from Burundi based in Bujumbura. Their home venue is 22,000 capacity Prince Louis Rwagasore Stadium.

The team currently plays in Burundi Premier League the top level of Burundian football.

Honours
Burundi Premier League: 1
2002

External links
Soccerway

Football clubs in Burundi
Bujumbura